Meagan Courtney Holder is an American actress, who is best known for her works throughout television. She portrayed Kelly Bowers on the comedy-drama series Born Again Virgin, Evelyn Sanders in drama series Pitch, Noelle Jackson in the drama series Unreal, Claudine on the crime-drama series Ringer, and Darby Conrad on the ABC Family series Make It or Break It. She has also made appearances in various television shows, such as 90210, Victorious, and Criminal Minds.

Early life
Holder graduated from California State University, Fullerton, where she was a member of the Gamma Phi Beta sorority.

Career
In film, Holder co-starred in Bring It On: Fight to the Finish (2009) and You Again (2010). Her other television credits include 90210, Shake It Up, NCIS: Los Angeles and Victorious. She also had six-episode stint as Claudine on The CW series Ringer.

Filmography

Film

Television

Web

References

External links

21st-century American actresses
American film actresses
American television actresses
California State University, Fullerton alumni
Living people
Place of birth missing (living people)
Year of birth missing (living people)